Grapow is a surname. Notable people with the surname include:

Hermann Grapow (1885–1967), German Egyptologist
Max von Grapow (1861–1924), German Admiral
Roland Grapow (born 1969), German guitarist